2014 Faroe Islands Premier League was the seventy-second season of top-tier football on the Faroe Islands. For sponsorship reasons, it was known as Effodeildin. Havnar Bóltfelag were the defending champions.

Teams

TB and 07 Vestur had finished 9th and 10th respectively at the end of the previous season and were relegated to the 1. deild as a result.

Replacing them were the 1. deild champions B68 and runners-up Skála.

Teams summaries

Note

Managerial changes

League table

Positions by round

Results 

The schedule consists of a total of 27 rounds. Each team plays three games against every opponent in no particular order. At least one of the games had to be at home and at least one had to be away. The additional home game for every match-up was randomly assigned prior to the season, with the top five teams of the previous season having 5 home games.

Regular home games

Additional home games

Top goalscorers

Hat-tricks

 1 Scored four goals.

Awards

Season awards

Team of the Season
Source: 
 Goalkeeper:  Teitur M. Gestsson (HB)
 Defenders:  Bárður Hansen (Víkingur),  Jóhan T. Davidsen (HB),  Hørður Askham (B36),  Alex Mellemgaard (B36).
 Midfielders:  Árni Frederiksberg (NSÍ),  Hallur Hansson (Víkingur),  Łukasz Cieślewicz (B36),  Hans Pauli Samuelsen (EB/Streymur).
 Forwards:  Klæmint Olsen,  Adeshina Lawal (B36).

Goal of the Month

Goal of the Year

See also
2014 Faroe Islands Cup
Faroe Islands Super Cup

References

Faroe Islands Premier League seasons
1
Faroe
Faroe